Zoltán Horváth (27 September 1979 – 28 December 2009) was a  Hungarian professional basketball player. He played for the Hungarian national basketball team from 2005 to 2009.

Horváth began his career on senior level in 2003 with the team of the PVSK Panthers from Pécs. He soon became the leading rebounder of the team, and in 2005 moved to the Hungarian league's defending champion, Atomerőmű SE. There, Horváth won the domestic championship and reached the national cup's final in his first year, and played in the FIBA EuroCup the following season. In 2007, he was signed by PAOK Thessaloniki, but played just four games for them before returning to Atomerőmű. Horváth then again became part of the defending domestic champion's roster, in that case Falco KC Szombathely. He reached the domestic cup's final in 2009, and developed into one of the league's dominating players during his last months, scoring more than 20 points in the first five matches of the season.

As part of his country's national team, Horváth took part in one match of the EuroBasket 2005 qualification, in six matches of the EuroBasket 2007 qualification, and in all six matches of the EuroBasket 2009 qualification's relegation. Although the Hungarian team eventually did not qualify for any of these tournaments, they at least avoided relegation from the Division A.

On 28 December 2009, Horváth was killed in a traffic accident on his way to Szombathely. He had crashed head-on into a truck after losing control of his car on the road's icy surface.

References 

1979 births
2009 deaths
20th-century Hungarian people
Atomerőmű SE players
Centers (basketball)
Hungarian men's basketball players
Hungarian expatriates in Greece
P.A.O.K. BC players
Power forwards (basketball)
PVSK Panthers players
Road incident deaths in Hungary
Sportspeople from Satu Mare
Falco KC Szombathely players